"Truth Is a Beautiful Thing" is a song performed by English trio London Grammar. The song was released in the United Kingdom as a digital download on 24 March 2017 as the third single from their second studio album Truth Is a Beautiful Thing (2017).

Track listing

Charts

Release history

References

2017 songs
2017 singles
London Grammar songs
Song recordings produced by Paul Epworth
Songs written by Hannah Reid
Songs written by Dan Rothman
Songs written by Dominic Major